Khalen Saunders (born August 9, 1996) is an American football defensive tackle for the New Orleans Saints of the National Football League (NFL). He played college football at Western Illinois.

College career
After playing high school football as a running back and a defensive lineman at Parkway Central High School, Saunders received only one Division I scholarship offer, from Western Illinois.

During his career at WIU, Saunders mainly played defensive line but also sporadically continued his career on the offensive side of the ball, recording a rushing and a receiving touchdown in his career. After his senior season, he became the first Leatherneck ever invited to the Senior Bowl, and while playing in the contest, recorded the game's first sack on Will Grier, earning accolades from Oakland Raiders coach Jon Gruden. Saunders also picked up exposure over the offseason by having a video of him backflipping featured on prominent draft analyst Adam Schefter's Twitter account; the tweet amassed over 7,000 likes.

Professional career

Kansas City Chiefs
Saunders was drafted by the Kansas City Chiefs in the third round with the 84th overall pick the 2019 NFL Draft. Saunders won Super Bowl LIV when the Chiefs defeated the San Francisco 49ers 31–20.

Saunders was placed on injured reserve on September 19, 2020 after suffering a dislocated elbow in Week 1. He was activated on October 24.

On November 30, 2021, Saunders was placed on injured reserve. He was activated on January 24, 2022.

In 2022, Saunders helped the Chiefs win Super Bowl LVII against the Philadelphia Eagles 38-35 with Saunders two tackles and a sack in the game.

New Orleans Saints
On March 17, 2023, Saunders signed a three-year, $14.5 million contract with the New Orleans Saints.

Personal life
He and his wife Ayanna Saunders had a daughter who was born while he was at the 2019 Senior Bowl.

References

External links
 Kansas City Chiefs bio
 Western Illinois Leathernecks bio
 

1996 births
Living people
American football defensive tackles
Kansas City Chiefs players
New Orleans Saints players
People from Chesterfield, Missouri
Players of American football from Missouri
Sportspeople from St. Louis County, Missouri
Western Illinois Leathernecks football players